The 2015 West Somerset District Council election took place on 7 May 2015 to elect members of West Somerset District Council in Somerset, England. The whole council was up for election and the Conservative Party remained in overall control of the council.

Election result

Ward results

By-elections between 2015 and 2019
A by-election was held in Dunster and Timberscombe ward on 23 March 2017 after the resignation of Conservative councillor Bryan Leaker. Leaker's vacated seat was won by the Liberal Democrat candidate Peter Pilkington, with a 49.7% share of the vote.

References

2015 English local elections
2015
2010s in Somerset